The Bielawa Owls are an American football team located in Bielawa, Poland. They play in the Liga Futbolu Amerykańskiego.

History
The team was founded in December 2007 by Przemysław Klinger. In 2010, they won the PLFA II championship and were promoted to the PLFA I.

Season-by-season records

References

External links 
 

American football teams in Poland
Dzierżoniów County
Sport in Lower Silesian Voivodeship
American football teams established in 2007
2007 establishments in Poland